George McMurtrie Godley (1917–1999) was an American diplomat who served as United States Ambassador to Laos 1969-1973, at the height of the Vietnam War.  President Richard Nixon nominated Godley as Assistant Secretary of State for East Asian and Pacific Affairs in 1973, but his nomination was rejected by the United States Senate Committee on Foreign Relations.

Biography

G. McMurtrie Godley, known informally as "Mac", was born on August 23, 1917 in New York City.  He was educated at the Hotchkiss School and at Yale University, and spent some time on graduate work at the University of Chicago.

Godley joined the United States Foreign Service in 1941. He was posted in France, Switzerland, Belgium, Cambodia and the Republic of the Congo (Léopoldville).

In 1946, he married Livia Paravicini, who had served as a sergeant major in the Swiss Army Ambulance Corps during World War II.  The couple divorced in 1963.

On February 20, 1964, President Lyndon B. Johnson appointed Godley United States Ambassador to the Democratic Republic of the Congo.  Ambassador Godley presented his credentials to the Congolese government on March 23, 1964.  During his time as ambassador, Mobutu Sese Seko staged a second coup and seized control of the country.  Godley left this post on October 15, 1966.

Godley married his second wife, Elizabeth McCray Johnson, in 1969. Together, they had two sons, George and Nicholas.

In 1969, President Nixon appointed Godley Ambassador to the Kingdom of Laos, with Ambassador Godley presenting his credentials on July 24.  Ambassador Godley arrived in the midst of the Laotian Civil War and effectuated the American policy of supporting the Royal Lao Government against the Communist Pathet Lao.  Although Laos was officially neutral in the ongoing Vietnam War, the Central Intelligence Agency was secretly active in Laos, organizing and financing Laotian and Thai guerillas who were fighting the Pathet Lao and the North Vietnamese.  Godley left his position as Ambassador to Laos on April 23, 1973.

Upon his return to the U.S., President Nixon nominated Godley as Assistant Secretary of State for East Asian and Pacific Affairs.  J. William Fulbright, the chairman of the United States Senate Committee on Foreign Relations, opposed this nomination, arguing that Godley was too closely identified with failed American policy in Southeast Asia to supervise U.S. diplomatic efforts in Asia.

Following the failure of this nomination, on February 13, 1974, President Nixon nominated Godley as United States Ambassador to Lebanon.  Ambassador Godley presented his credentials on March 15, 1974, and served as Ambassador to Lebanon until January 13, 1976.

Upon his return from Lebanon, Godley retired from the Foreign Service and settled in Morris, New York.  At this time, Godley learned that he had throat cancer and his larynx was removed as a result.  In spite of his battle with throat cancer, Godley enjoyed an active retirement.  He participated in founding the Glimmerglass Opera near Cooperstown, New York, serving as its first president, and later as chairman emeritus until the time of his death.  He also served as chairman of Hartwick College and of Oneonta's Fox Hospital.

In August 1992, Godley's activities as Ambassador to Laos were examined by the United States Senate Select Committee on POW/MIA Affairs.  Some reports suggested that during the withdrawal of U.S. troops from Indochina in the wake of the Fall of Saigon, as many as 135 American prisoners of war may have been left behind.  Before the committee, Godley testified that he had done his best to account for all American P.O.W.s in Indochina, and that he believed that no P.O.W.s remained when he left Indochina in 1973.

Godley died at age 82 of heart failure on November 7, 1999, at Fox Hospital in Oneonta, New York.

References

External links

1917 births
1999 deaths
Deaths from cancer in New York (state)
Deaths from esophageal cancer
Hotchkiss School alumni
People from New York City
People from Morris, New York
Ambassadors of the United States to the Democratic Republic of the Congo
Ambassadors of the United States to Laos
Ambassadors of the United States to Lebanon
University of Chicago alumni
Yale University alumni
United States Foreign Service personnel
Assistant Secretaries of State for East Asian and Pacific Affairs